Geoffrey Seddon Shepherd (1898 – 1984) was an American statistician and econometrician. He taught at Iowa State University, after earning his Ph.D. from Harvard University in 1932.

References

External links 
 

1898 births
1984 deaths
American statisticians
Harvard University alumni
Iowa State University faculty